Lei Feng (18 December 194015 August 1962) was allegedly a soldier in the People's Liberation Army who was the object of several major propaganda campaigns in China. The most well-known of these campaigns in 1963 promoted the slogan, "Follow the examples of Comrade Lei Feng." Lei was portrayed as a model citizen, and the masses were encouraged to emulate his selflessness, modesty, and devotion to Mao Zedong. After Mao's death, state media continued to promote Lei Feng as a model of earnestness and service, and his image still appears in popular forms such as on T-shirts and memorabilia.

The biographic details of Lei Feng's life, and especially his diary, supposedly discovered after his death, are generally believed to be propaganda creations; even the historicity of Lei Feng himself is sometimes questioned. The continuing use of Lei in government propaganda has become a source of cynicism and even derision amongst segments of the Chinese population. Nevertheless, Lei's function as a propaganda icon has survived decades of political change in China.

Life

The current biography of Lei Feng as given in China's state media says that he was born in Wangcheng (near the town of Leifeng, Changsha, Hunan, named in his honour).  According to CNTV, Lei lost all of his family before the establishment of the People's Republic, becoming an orphan. His father died when he was just five (killed by the invading Japanese Army), his elder brother, who was exploited as a child labourer, died a year later, and his younger brother passed soon afterward.  Finally, his mother committed suicide after being "dishonored by a landlord."
He became a member of the Communist youth corps when he was young and joined a transportation unit of the People's Liberation Army at the age of twenty. According to his official biography, Lei died in 1962 at the age of 21 (22 by East Asian age reckoning, by which a newborn is age 1 at birth), when a telephone pole, struck by an army truck, hit him as he was directing the truck in backing up.

Popular image

Lei Feng was not widely known until after his death. In 1963, Lei Feng's Diary was first presented to the public by Lin Biao in the first of many "Learn from Lei Feng" campaigns. The diary was full of accounts of Lei's admiration for Mao Zedong, his selfless deeds, and his desire to foment revolutionary spirit. Famously, he pledged that his only ambition was "to be a rustless screw" in the revolutionary cause. Lin's use of Lei's diary was part of a larger effort to improve Mao's image, which had suffered after the Great Leap Forward. Scholars generally believe that the diary was forged by Party officials under Lin's direction.

The diary contains about 200,000 words describing selfless thoughts with enthusiastic comments on Mao and the inspiring nature of the Party. The campaign began at a time when the Chinese economy was recovering from the Great Leap Forward campaign. In 1964 the Lei Feng campaign shifted gradually from doing good deeds to a cult of Mao.

Chinese leaders have praised Lei Feng as the personification of altruism. Leaders who have written about Lei Feng include Deng Xiaoping, Zhou Enlai, and Jiang Zemin. His cultural importance is still reproduced and reinforced by the media and cultural apparatus of the Chinese party-state, including emphasizing the importance of moral character during Mao's era. Lei Feng's prominence in school textbooks has since declined, although he remains part of the national curriculum. The phrase huó Léi Fēng (lit. "living Lei Feng") has become a noun (or adjective) for anyone who is seen as selfless, or anyone who goes out of their way to help others.

The CCP's construction of Lei Feng as a celebrity soldier is unique to the PRC and differs from the more typical creation of military heroes by governments during times of war. In the PRC, Lei Feng was part of continuing public promotion of soldiers as exemplary models, and evidence of the People's Liberation Army's role as social and political support to the Communist government.

Historicity
Details of Lei Feng's life have been subject to dispute. While someone named Lei Feng may have existed, scholars generally believe the person depicted in the campaign was almost certainly a fabrication. Some observers noted, for instance, that the campaign presented a collection of twelve photographs of Lei Feng performing good deeds. The photographs were of exceptionally high professional quality, and depicted Lei—supposedly an obscure and unknown young man—engaging in mundane tasks.

The lauded details of Lei Feng's life according to official documents led him to become a subject of derision and cynicism among segments of the Chinese populace. As John Fraser recalled, "Any Chinese I ever spoke to outside of official occasions always snorted about Lei Feng."

A 2008 Xinhua survey noted that a large number of elementary school students have vague knowledge of Lei Feng's life, and that 32 percent of the surveyed have read Lei's diary.

Contemporary cultural importance

5 March has become the official "Learn from Lei Feng Day". This day involves various community and school events where people go to clean up parks, schools, and other community locations. Local news on that day usually has footage from these events.

Lei Feng is especially honoured in Changsha, Hunan, and in Fushun, Liaoning. The Lei Feng Memorial Hall (in his birthplace, now named for him, Leifeng) and Lei Feng statue are located in Changsha. The local hospital carries his name. There is also a Lei Feng Memorial Hall, with a museum, in Fushun. Lei Feng's military unit was based in Fushun, where he died. His tomb is located on the memorial grounds. To commemorate Lei Feng, the city of Fushun named several landmarks in honor of him. There is a Lei Feng Road, a Lei Feng Elementary School, a Lei Feng Middle School and a Leifeng bank office.

There is a common misconception that Lei Feng was well known in the US and honored at West Point. The myth has been traced to a 1981 April Fool's Day article that Xinhua News Agency reporter Li Zhurun mistook for a real article. Li issued a retraction in 2015.

Lei Feng's story continues to be referenced in popular culture. A popular song by Jilin singer Xue Cun (雪村) is called "All Northeasterners are Living Lei Fengs". A 1995 release, originally notable only for its use of Northeastern Mandarin, it shot to nationwide fame when it was combined with kitsch animations on the Internet in 2001. In March 2006, a Chinese organization released an online game titled Learn from Lei Feng Online (学雷锋) in which the player has to do good deeds, fight spies, and collect parts of Mao Zedong's collection. If the player wins, he or she gets to meet Chairman Mao in the game. In the 21st century his image has been used to sell items including, in one case, condom packaging.

By the 2010s, interest in Lei Feng had devolved into kitsch, with his face still commonly appearing on t-shirts, stickers, and posters, but interest in his life story and diary minimal, as ticket sales to feature-length biographical films, Young Lei Feng, Lei Feng’s Smile and Lei Feng 1959, released on Learn from Lei Feng Day, failed to produce any takers at all in some cities. Reportedly, party cadres in rural areas have been charged by the State Administration of Radio, Film, and Television with organizing group viewings.

See also
 Comrade Ogilvy
 Dong Cunrui
 Wang Jinxi
 Former Residence of Lei Feng
 List of campaigns of the Chinese Communist Party
 Zhang Side
 Pavlik Morozov
 Alexey Stakhanov

Notes

References

Further reading 
 Edwards, L. (2010). "Military Celebrity in China: The Evolution of 'Heroic and Model Servicemen'". In Jeffreys, Elaine & Edwards, Louise (eds.), Celebrity in China, Hong Kong University Press, Hong Kong pp. 21–44. .

External links

 Lei Feng Museum Website in Fushun, Liaoning (Chinese)
 Propaganda posters of Lei Feng from Dutch academic collections

1940 births
1962 deaths
Accidental deaths in the People's Republic of China
Campaigns of the Chinese Communist Party
Chinese communists
Fushun
Legendary Chinese people
People whose existence is disputed
People from Changsha
People's Liberation Army personnel
Propaganda in China
Propaganda legends